Cundiff may refer to:
Cundiff, Kentucky
Cundiff, Texas

People with the name Cundiff
Billy Cundiff
Frederick Cundiff

See also
Rusty Cundieff